Corfe Barrows Nature Park comprises around nine natural areas, covering an area of 90 hectares, within the Borough of Poole that are being managed for the benefit of wildlife and people. It was designated as a nature park in June 2016.

Description 
The nature park includes areas of woodland, heath, meadows and pastures that are linked by footpaths and guided trails. It is home to some of the rarest wildlife in Britain as well as Bronze Age barrows, evidence of its long history of settlement. The eight sites, which are open to the public, are:

 Happy Bottom - Nature Reserve and part SNCI
 Ashington Meadow and Cutting
 Barrow Hill
 Cogdean Elms - local nature reserve
 Rushcombe Bottom - SSSI and local nature reserve
 Diprose Dale
 Corfe Hills West - SSSI
 Corfe Hills Middle and South.

The various sites are owned by the Dorset Wildlife Trust, Erica Trust, Borough of Poole, Amphibian and Reptile Conservation, Christchurch District Council and East Dorset District Council.

Habitats 
Wet grassland, dry grassland, mature hedges, wet woodland and heathland.

Species 
The nature park is home to various species of bird including: buzzard, great spotted woodpecker, stonechat, nightjar and the rare Dartford warbler. Other animals include roe deer, sand lizard and various species of bat.

Wild flowers include: ragged robin, knapweed, ox-eye daisy, bird's foot trefoil and various heathers.

Walking and cycling 
There are small parking areas on Merley Park Road, but the area is best approached on foot by bus or by bicycle.

The terrain is rated as moderately difficult and there is a variety of public rights of way, permissive paths and board walks, most of which are waymarked. Information boards have also been set up at the entry points to the sites. There are cycleways along the Roman Road bridleway and Castleman Trail and the Stour Valley Way passes about 500 metres away to the north of the Happy Bottom Nature Reserve.

See also 
 Holes Bay Nature Park

References

External links 
 Corfe Barrows Nature Park at Dorset Wildlife Trust website.
  Downloadable map

Nature parks
Geography of Poole
Protected areas of Dorset